Saprosma elegans is a species of flowering plants in the family Rubiaceae. It is found in Indonesia.

References

External links 
 
 Saprosma elegans at the Plant List
 Isotype of Cleisocratera elegans Korth. at herbarium of Naturalis Biodiversity Centre, formerly Leiden University (via Jstor Global Names)

elegans
Plants described in 2008